La Punta is a village and municipality in San Luis Province in central Argentina.

References

Populated places in San Luis Province
Cities in Argentina
Argentina
San Luis Province